S27 may refer to:

Aviation 
 Blériot-SPAD S.27, a French biplane airliner
 Kalispell City Airport, in Flathead County, Montana, United States
 Short S.27, a British military trainer
 Sikorsky S-27, a Russian biplane bomber

Rail and transit 
 S27 (Long Island bus)
 S27 (Munich), a line of the Munich S-Bahn
 S27 (Südostbahn), a railway service in Switzerland
 Rankoshi Station, in Hokkaido, Japan

Other uses 
 40S ribosomal protein S27
 British NVC community S27, a swamps and tall-herb fens community in the British National Vegetation Classification system
 County Route S27 (California)
 , a submarine of the Royal Navy
 S27: Take off immediately all contaminated clothing, a safety phrase
 Sulfur-27, an isotope of sulfur
 , a submarine of the United States Navy